NGC 4459 is a lenticular galaxy located about 50 million light-years away in the constellation of Coma Berenices. NGC 4459 is also classified as a LINER galaxy. NGC 4459 was discovered by astronomer William Herschel on January 14, 1787. NGC 4459 is a member of the Virgo Cluster.

Physical characteristics

Dust disk
NGC 4459 has a central flocculent dust disk that surrounds an inner ring.  Also, there appears to be evidence of ongoing star formation in the disk .

Super massive black hole
NGC 4459 has a supermassive black hole with an estimated mass of roughly 70 million suns ( M☉). Its diameter is estimated to be around 2.87 astronomical units (266.4 million mi).

See also
 List of NGC objects (4001–5000)
 Messier 64

References

External links

Lenticular galaxies
LINER galaxies
Coma Berenices
4459
41104
7614
Astronomical objects discovered in 1787
Virgo Cluster